The Yingbin Road railway station is an underground railway station. The railway station is on the Lidui Branch Line of Chengdu–Dujiangyan Intercity Railway in Chengdu, Sichuan, China.

Destinations and Prices

Rolling Stock
China Railways CRH1A

See also

Chengdu–Dujiangyan Intercity Railway

Stations on the Chengdu–Dujiangyan Intercity Railway
Railway stations in Sichuan
Railway stations in China opened in 2013